Carenum rutilans is a species of ground beetle found commonly in Australia in the subfamily Scaritinae. It was described by Sloane in 1907.

References

rutilans
Beetles described in 1907